William Beal may refer to:

William Beal (writer) (1815–1870), English religious writer
William James Beal (1833–1924), American botanist
William Beal (cricketer) (1877–1964), Australian-born New Zealand cricketer

See also
William Beale (disambiguation)
Beal (surname)